Alice Home TV was Telecom Italia IPTV service in Italy launched in November 2005.

Sky Italia and Mediaset Premium channels were available with a separate subscription.

External links 
 

Streaming television
Digital television
Television networks in Italy